Patriots of Ulek is an adventure module for the fantasy role-playing game Dungeons & Dragons, set in the game's World of Greyhawk campaign setting.

Plot summary
The adventure takes place in the Principality of Ulek in the southwestern Flanaess.

Publication history
The module bears the code WGQ1 and was published by TSR, Inc. in 1992 for the second edition Advanced Dungeons & Dragons rules.

The module was written by Anthony Pryor with cover art by John and Laura Lakey and interior art by Ken Frank.

Reception

References

External links
Patriots of Ulek at the TSR Archive

Greyhawk modules
Role-playing game supplements introduced in 1992